The State Emblem of the Tajik Soviet Socialist Republic was adopted on March 1, 1937 by the government of the Tajik Soviet Socialist Republic. The emblem is based on the State Emblem of the Soviet Union. It shows symbols of agriculture (cotton and wheat). The red star is prominently featured with a small hammer and sickle within it. The rising sun stands for the future of the Tajik nation, and the star as well as the hammer and sickle for the victory of communism and the "world-wide socialist community of states". The emblem was replaced with the new emblem in 1992, which uses a similar design to the Soviet one. It was, however, was replacing the red banner with the current national flag, the big red star was replaced by the mountains, represents Pamir, the Samanid dynasty crown, and added the Quran book at below. It represents Islam as the official religion.

The banner bears the Soviet Union state motto ("Workers of the world, unite!") in both the Tajik and Russian languages. In Tajik, it is "'Пролетарҳои ҳамаи мамлакатҳо, як шавед!" (transliterated: "Proletarhoi hamai mamlakatho, jak şaved!").

The name of the republic is also shown in both Tajik and Russian. The final form of the emblem was designed by painter Alexander Semyonovich Yakovlev.

History

Tajik ASSR

In accordance with the decree of the Presidium of the CEC of the Tajik ASSR, dated 23 February 1929,

In accordance with article 105 of the 1929 Constitution of the Tajik ASSR,

Tajik SSR
According to the Constitution of the Tajik SSR, adopted on 24 February 1931 4th Congress of Soviets of the Tajik SSR:

According to the Constitution, adopted by V Congress of Soviets in January 1935, coat of arms remained unchanged, only the name of the Republic became abbreviated as "the Tajik SSR". On June 27, 1935, the Presidium of the CEC of the Tajik SSR invited the artist Alexander Yakovlev S. to Refine your project of the emblem (project A. S. Yakovlev took 1st place in the competition, 1934).

On 4 July 1935, a revised draft was approved by the Presidium of the CEC of the Tajik SSR. Later at April 27, 1936, this draft was approved by the Decree of the CEC of the Tajik SSR. Description of this emblem:

April 27, 1936, the Presidium of the CEC of the Tajik SSR adopted the resolution "On approval of the description of the State emblem of the Tajik Soviet socialist Republic". May 26, 1936 fourth session of the CEC of the Tajik SSR of the fifth convocation adopted the images and descriptions of the coat of arms and flag and made these descriptions in article 92 and 93 of the Constitution of the Tajik SSR.

According to the Constitution, adopted during VI Extraordinary Congress of Soviets on March 1, 1937, the emblem has been greatly simplified: in the centre of the coat of arms in the Golden rays of the sun depicted a red five-pointed star, the top of which were placed the Golden hammer and sickle. All framed by a garland of ears of wheat (right) and branches of cotton with opened bolls (left). Wreath twined the red ribbon with inscriptions in Tajik and Russian languages: "Proletarians of all countries, unite!" and "Tajik SSR"(at the base of the wreath).

On the basis of the constitutional descriptions of the preparation of the images of the emblem and flag. May 19, 1937 the Presidium of the CEC of the Tajik SSR has considered the figures of the coat of arms and flag of the Republic and recommended to do the motto on the coat of arms of gold, to make the background of the emblem and leaves of cotton light green, hammer and sickle on the star to represent gold.

May 20, 1937, the Presidium of the CEC of the Tajik SSR had reviewed the draft drawings of the coat of arms and flag, adopted a decree "About the State emblem and flag of the Tajik SSR". This resolution was finally approved with some changes, the Motto "Proletarians of all countries, unite!" was recommended to write in gold, the background and the leaves of cotton to pale green, the sickle and the hammer of gold, the rays of the sun to place on the circumference. On May 23, 1937, the Presidium of the CEC approved the coat of arms. According to established in 1937 as a Commission under the Presidium of the Supreme Soviet of the translation of the motto "Proletarians of all countries, unite!" in Tajik language was made accurately.

In 1938, the word "Çumhurijat" was replaced by "Respublika", resulting in the inscription on the emblem took the form of "RSS Tocikiston". Later on September 28, 1940, the Presidium of the Supreme Soviet of the Tajik SSR issued a decree who changed the spelling of the texts of the inscriptions on the flag and coat of arms from Latin alphabet to Cyrillic. Later, in the 1978 Constitution of the Tajik SSR, description of the coat of arms has not changed. The official description of the coat of arms in the text of the Constitution:

The emblem was changed in 1992 to the present Emblem of Tajikistan, which uses a design similar to the different Soviet symbols.

See also 

 Flag of the Tajik Soviet Socialist Republic
 Flag of Tajikistan
 Emblem of Tajikistan

References

Tajik SSR
Tajik Soviet Socialist Republic
National symbols of Tajikistan
Tajik SSR
Tajik SSR
Tajik SSR
Tajik SSR
Tajik SSR
Tajik SFSR